"Spend My Life with You" is a Grammy-nominated R&B song by R&B singer Eric Benét, featuring R&B singer Tamia. Released as the second single from Benét's second studio album A Day in the Life (1999), the song spent three weeks at number one on the US Billboard Hot R&B/Hip-Hop Songs chart and was certified Gold by the Recording Industry Association of America (RIAA) for sales of over 500,000 units. It also peaked at number 21 on the Billboard Hot 100.

Remix
A Buttered Soul Remix was released featuring Terry Dexter.

Charts

Weekly charts

Year-end charts

Certifications

See also
 R&B number-one hits of 1999 (USA)

References

1999 singles
Tamia songs
1998 songs
Warner Records singles
Neo soul songs
Contemporary R&B ballads
Male–female vocal duets
1990s ballads